The Gothic Mountains is a group of mountains,  long, in the Queen Maud Mountains of Antarctica, located west of Watson Escarpment and bounded by Scott Glacier, Albanus Glacier, and Griffith Glacier. The mountains were first visited in December 1934 by the Byrd Antarctic Expedition (ByrdAE) geological party led by Quin Blackburn. The name was proposed by Edmund Stump, leader of a U.S. Antarctic Research Program (USARP) - Arizona State University geological party which made investigations here in the 1980-81 season. The mountains are composed of granites which have weathered to produce a series of spires and peaks reminiscent of a Gothic cathedral.

Key mountains 
 Altar Peak is a peak (1,780 m) located 1 nautical mile (1.9 km) east-southeast of Mount Harkness. The feature was first visited in December 1934 by the Byrd Antarctic Expedition geological party under Quin Blackburn. The descriptive name was suggested by Edmund Stump, leader of a United States Antarctic Research Program (USARP)-Arizona State University geological party which studied this peak, 1987-88.
 Grizzly Peak is a peak rising to 2,200 m on the southwest flank of Mount Zanuck. The feature was visited in December 1934 by the Byrd Antarctic Expedition geological party and was included in "Darryl Zanuck Mountain." The granite of this peak is highly jointed and fairly bristles with small spires, suggestive of the coat of a grizzly bear.
The feature stands at the south side of Albanus Glacier at the point where the latter joins Scott Glacier. Discovered by Byrd on the Byrd Antarctic Expedition flight to the South Pole in November 1929. The mountain was visited in December 1934 by the Byrd Antarctic Expedition geological party under Quin Blackburn. Named by Byrd for Darryl F. Zanuck, official of Twentieth Century-Fox Pictures, who assisted the Byrd Antarctic Expedition, 1933–35, in assembling motion-picture records, and later supplied the United States Antarctic Service (USAS), 1939–41, with motion-picture projectors.
 Zanuck East Peak is the easternmost of the three high peaks that rise from Mount Zanuck massif. The peak was discovered and mapped by the geological party of the Byrd Antarctic Expedition, 1933–35, led by Quin Blackburn. The name was applied in association with Mount Zanuck by members of New Zealand Geological Survey Antarctic Expedition (NZGSAE) who climbed the peak in the 1969-70 season.

Features
Geographical features include:

 Organ Pipe Peaks
 Sanctuary Glacier
 The Spectre

References

Queen Maud Mountains
Mountain ranges
Mountain ranges of Antarctica
Amundsen Coast
Gould Coast